Whitewater Draw, originally Rio de Agua Prieta, [Spanish: river of dark water], is a tributary stream of the Rio de Agua Prieta in Cochise County, Arizona.  It was called Blackwater Creek by Philip St. George Cooke when his command, the Mormon Battalion, camped at a spring on its course on December 5, 1846.

The San Bernardino River joins the Bavispe River at Morelos, Sonora at the northern end of the Sierra del Tigre. The Bavispe River flows south by southwest to the Yaqui River and eventually to the Gulf of California at Ciudad Obregon, Sonora.

References

Rivers of Cochise County, Arizona
Rivers of Sonora
International rivers of North America
Cooke's Wagon Road
Rivers of Arizona